True polar wander is a solid-body rotation of a planet or moon with respect to its spin axis, causing the geographic locations of the north and south poles to change, or "wander". Unless the body is totally rigid (which the Earth is not) its stable state rotation has the largest moment of inertia axis aligned with the spin axis, with the smaller two moments of inertia axes lying in the plane of the equator. If the body is not in this steady state, true polar wander will occur: the planet or moon will rotate as a rigid body to realign the largest moment of inertia axis with the spin axis. (See .)

If the body is near the steady state but with the angular momentum not exactly lined up with the largest moment of inertia axis, the pole position will oscillate. Weather and water movements can also induce small changes. These subjects are covered in the article Polar motion.

Description in the context of Earth

The mass distribution of the Earth is not spherically symmetric, and the Earth has three different moments of inertia. The axis around which the moment of inertia is greatest is closely aligned with the rotation axis (the axis going through the geographic North and South Poles). The other two axes are near the equator. That is similar to a brick rotating around an axis going through its shortest dimension (a vertical axis when the brick is lying flat). However, if the moment of inertia around one of the two axes close to the equator becomes nearly equal to that around the polar axis, the constraint on the orientation of the object (the Earth) is relaxed.

This situation is like a rugby football or an American football spinning around an axis running through its "equator". (Note that the "equator" of the ball does not correspond to the equator of the Earth.) Small perturbations can move the football, which then spins around another axis through the same "equator". In the same way, conditions can make the Earth (both the crust and the mantle) slowly reorient until a new geographic point moves to the North Pole, with the axis of low moment of inertia being kept very near the equator.

Such a reorientation changes the latitudes of most points on the Earth by an amount that depends on how far they are from the axis near the equator that does not move.

Examples
Cases of true polar wander have occurred several times in the course of the Earth's history. It has been suggested that east Asia moved south due to true polar wander by 25° between about 174 and 157 million years ago. Mars, Europa, and Enceladus are also believed to have undergone true pole wander, in the case of Europa by 80°.

Uranus' extreme inclination with respect to the ecliptic is not an instance of true polar wander (a shift of the body relative to its rotational axis), but instead a large shift of the rotational axis itself. This axis shift is believed to be the result of a catastrophic series of impacts that occurred billions of years ago.

Distinctions and delimitations
Polar wander should not be confused with precession, which is where the axis of rotation moves, in other words the North Pole points toward a different star. There are also smaller and faster variations in the axis of rotation going under the term nutation. Precession is caused by the gravitational attraction of the Moon and Sun, and occurs all the time and at a much faster rate than polar wander. It does not result in changes of latitude.

True polar wander has to be distinguished from continental drift, which is where different parts of the Earth's crust move in different directions because of circulation in the mantle.

The effect should further not be confused with the effect known as geomagnetic reversal that describes the repeated proven reversal of the magnetic field of the Earth.

Tectonic plate reconstructions
Paleomagnetism is used to create tectonic plate reconstructions by finding the paleolatitude of a particular site. This paleolatitude is affected both by true polar wander and by plate tectonics.  To reconstruct plate tectonic histories, geologists must obtain a number of dated paleomagnetic samples. Because true polar wander is a global phenomenon but tectonic motions are specific to each plate, multiple dates allow them to separate the tectonic and true polar wander signals.

See also
 Apparent polar wander
 Axial tilt
 Cataclysmic pole shift hypothesis (includes discussion of various historical conjectures involving rapid shift of the poles)
 Polar motion
 True polar wander on Mars

References

Geodesy
Geodynamics
Paleomagnetism